Federal Barn, also known as the barn at Cressbrook Farm, is a historic barn located in Tredyffrin Township, Chester County, Pennsylvania. The barn was built in two sections; the older dated to 1792 and the second section to about 1840.  It is a two-story., six bay, Pennsylvania bank barn.  It is of fieldstone and frame construction and has a gable roof.  The barn is located about 150 feet from Cressbrook Farm house.

It was listed on the National Register of Historic Places in 1980.

References

Barns on the National Register of Historic Places in Pennsylvania
Infrastructure completed in 1840
Buildings and structures in Chester County, Pennsylvania
National Register of Historic Places in Chester County, Pennsylvania